Necromancies and Netherworlds: Uncanny Stories is a collection of dark fantasy short stories by American writer Darrell Schweitzer in collaboration with illustrator Jason Van Hollander. It was first published in hardcover and trade paperback by Borgo Press/Wildside Press in August 1999. It was nominated for the 2000 World Fantasy Award for Best Collection.

Summary
The collection consists of ten works of the authors. The pieces were originally published from 1990-1996 in various speculative fiction magazines and anthologies.

Contents
 "The Crystal-Man" (from Interzone no. 111, Sep. 1996)
 "The Cloth Gods of Zhamir" (from Weird Tales v. 52, no. 4, Sum. 1991)
 "Men Without Maps" (from Marion Zimmer Bradley's Fantasy Magazine no. 11, Win. 1991)
 "The Caravan of the Dead" (from Weirdbook no. 27, Spr. 1992)
 "The Unmaker of Men" (from Weird Tales v. 52, no. 1, Fall 1990)
 "The Magical Dilemma of Mondesir" (from Century no. 2, May/Jun. 1995)
 "The Paloverde Lodge" (from Fear no. 28, Win. 1990)
 "Those of the Air" (from Cthulhu’s Heirs: Tales of the Mythos for the New Millennium, Mar. 1994)
 "The Throwing Suit" (from The Horror Show v. 8, no. 1, Spr. 1990)
 "The Man in the White Mask" (from Worlds of Fantasy & Horror v. 1, no. 1, Sum. 1994)

Reception
The collection was reviewed by Chris Gilmore in Interzone no. 155, May 2000, and Paul Di Filippo in Asimov's Science Fiction, August 2000.

References

1999 short story collections
Short story collections by Darrell Schweitzer
Fantasy short story collections
Wildside Press books